Lohmar (Ripuarian: Luhme) is a town in the Rhein-Sieg district, in North Rhine-Westphalia, Germany.

Geography
Lohmar is located about 20 km east of Cologne and 15 km north-east of Bonn in the Bergisches Land area. Because it is only 20 minutes by car to Cologne or Bonn, Lohmar is a popular place for commuters. The main part of the town area is at the course of the Agger, southern of Overath.

History
Lohmar was first mentioned as a donation of archbishop Sigewid to the church of Cologne. A farmyard in Lomereis mentioned.

Lohmar is also mentioned on the Arc de Triomphe in Paris as a place of Napoleon's visit. While his inspection of the army positioned in the Rhineland in 1811 he lived in Schloss Auel in Lohmar.

Politics

Town council

The town council consists of 40 members. The current breakdown after the local elections held on 13 September 2020 is as follows:

 CDU 16 members
 Grüne 14 members
 SPD 5 members
 FDP 2 members
 UWG 2 members
 Volksabstimmung 1 member

The CDU and Grünen govern the town as a coalition.

Mayor
 Mayor: Claudia Wieja (Grüne)

Coat of arms

The coat of arms contains a lion of Berg in the upper fragment. It symbolizes the former jurisdiction by the Earldom of Berg. The lower fraction shows the meeting of the Agger and the Sülz rivers.

Twin towns – sister cities

Lohmar is twinned with:
 Eppendorf, Germany (1990)
 Frouard, France (1974)
 Pompey, France (1974)
 Vila Verde, Portugal (1986)
 Żarów, Poland (2007)

Transport
Lohmar is served by Honrath railway station on the Cologne–Overath railway. A train to Cologne stops every 30 minutes. The trip to Cologne lasts about 30 minutes. A service runs in the other direction to Overath every 30 minutes.

Roads
Lohmar is connected to the Bundesautobahn 3 with following exits:
 Rösrath/Lohmar-Nord (only coming from Cologne)
 Lohmar-Nord/Rösrath
 Lohmar
The Bundesautobahn 4 connects through exit 
 Overath

Airports
The Cologne Bonn Airport is reachable within 25 minutes.

References

External links

Official website 

Towns in North Rhine-Westphalia